Epleys (also known as Epley Station, Epley's Station) is an unincorporated community in Logan County, Kentucky, United States.

History
Epleys was established circa 1872 as a future station along the railroad, which was expected to be built through the area. Fritz Epley was the first settler and gave the community its name. The community had post offices under two different names: one as Epley from 1887 to 1888, and one as Epley Station from 1891 to 1921.

Notable residents
Velma Williams Smith, country musician, was born in Epleys.

Notes

Unincorporated communities in Logan County, Kentucky
Unincorporated communities in Kentucky